Darnell Clash (born June 18, 1962) is a former American football defensive back who played four seasons in the Canadian Football League (CFL) with the BC Lions and Toronto Argonauts. He played college football at the University of Wyoming.

College career
Clash played for the Wyoming Cowboys from 1980 to 1982. He set a school record for most career kick and punt returns with 153 and most combined kick and punt return yardage with 2,286. He earned All-Western Athletic Conference honors  in 1981. Clash also recorded seven career interceptions.

Professional career
Clash played in 39 games for the BC Lions from 1984 to 1987. He earned CFL All-Star honors in 1985. He played in sixteen games for the Toronto Argonauts during the 1987 season, garnering CFL East All-Star recognition.

References

External links
Just Sports Stats
College stats

Living people
1962 births
Players of American football from Maryland
American football defensive backs
American football return specialists
Canadian football defensive backs
Canadian football return specialists
African-American players of American football
African-American players of Canadian football
Wyoming Cowboys football players
BC Lions players
Toronto Argonauts players
People from Cambridge, Maryland
21st-century African-American people
20th-century African-American sportspeople